This is a list of American television-related events in 1964.

Events

Television programs

Debuts

Ending this year

Television films, specials and miniseries

Television stations

Sign-ons

Network affiliation changes

Station closures

Births

Deaths

See also 
1964 in television 
1964 in film 
1964 in the United States 
List of American films of 1964

References

External links 
List of 1964 American television series at IMDb